Dorcadion castilianum is a species of beetle in the family Cerambycidae. It was described by Chevrolat in 1862. It is known from Spain.

See also 
Dorcadion

References

castilianum
Beetles described in 1862